Paul L. McDowell (January 17, 1905 – August 14, 1962) was an American rower who competed in the 1928 Summer Olympics.

In 1928 he won the bronze medal with his partner John Schmitt in the coxless pairs competition.

External links
Paul McDowell's profile at databaseOlympics
Paul McDowell's profile at Sports Reference.com

1905 births
1962 deaths
Rowers at the 1928 Summer Olympics
Olympic bronze medalists for the United States in rowing
American male rowers
Medalists at the 1928 Summer Olympics